Eenpalu is an Estonian surname. Notable people with the surname include:
 Kaarel Eenpalu (1888–1942, before 1935 Karl Einbund), politician and journalist
 Linda Eenpalu (1890–1967, before 1935 Linda Einbund), politician

Estonian-language surnames